Lorenzo Crespi (born Vincenzo Leopizzi on 13 August 1971) is an Italian film and television actor.

Life and career 
Born  in Messina, Crespi made his film debut in 1995, in Pappi Corsicato's Black Holes. In 1998 he  won the Globo d'oro for best breakthrough actor for his performance in Porzûs.

Selected filmography 
 Black Holes (1995)
 The Stendhal Syndrome (1995)
 The Return of Sandokan (TV, 1996) 
 The Nymph (1996)
 Marianna Ucrìa (1997)
 Porzûs (1997)
 Carabinieri (TV, 2002 – 2003)
 Gente di mare (TV, 2005 – 2007)
 Imperium: Pompeii (TV, 2007)
  Un Hada, cortometraggio, regia di José Militano (2016)

TV

 Il ritorno di Sandokan - miniserie TV, 4 episodi (1996) La principessa e il povero - film TV (1997) Operazione Odissea - film TV (1999) Donne di mafia - film TV (2001) Carabinieri - serie TV, 21 episodi (2002) Pompei - miniserie TV, 2 episodi (2007) Gente di mare - serie TV, 34 episodi (2005-2007) Mogli a pezzi - serie TV (2008) Vita da paparazzo - film TV (2008)''

Videoclip musicali
È Natale per noi dei Controtempo, regia di Nicola Gennari (201

References

External links 
 

1971 births
20th-century Italian male actors
21st-century Italian male actors
Italian male film actors
Italian male television actors 
Actors from Messina
Living people